"Better Not Said" is a song by Australian DJ and recording artist Havana Brown.

Brown said the song has multiple meanings; “A lot of things are better not said,” she explained. “It is when you can keep control of a situation, from relationships to the bedroom to work. It is everything. Sometimes things are better on your own, doing it yourself.” 

"Better Not Said" was released digitally on 12 September 2014. In Australia, the track debuted and peaked at number 79 on the ARIA Singles Chart.

Background
"Whatever We Want" was written by Brown together with Richard Vission, Luciana Caporaso, Nick Clow, Lazonte Franklin, Niclas Kings and Jonas Saeed who had worked with Brown on her "Better Not Said" single.

Music video
A music video to accompany the release of "Better Not Said" was first released on YouTube on 18 September  2014 at a total length of three minutes and forty-one seconds.

Track listing

Charts
"Better Not Said" debuted at No.81 and rose to its peak of No.79 the following week.

Weekly charts

Release history

References

2014 singles
Havana Brown (musician) songs
2014 songs
Island Records singles
Songs written by Luciana Caporaso
Songs written by Nick Clow
Songs written by Havana Brown (musician)
Songs written by Jonas Saeed
Songs written by Niclas Kings